StarzPlay by Cinepax also known as StarzPlay or StarzPlay Pakistan is a streaming video on demand service available in Pakistan. It was launched as a joint venture between Cinepax, a Pakistani cinema chain and Lionsgate's StarzPlay Arabia. Pakistan is the first country outside the MENA region where the service is available.

StarzPlay has a library of acquired content from the United States, United Kingdom, India, Pakistan and a few other countries. Original programs broadcast on Starz in the United States are also available on StarzPlay.

The streaming service has a few Pakistani originals which are short films. In 2019, StarzPlay by Cinepax released its first original Kaash Keh in 2019 which is a collection of four short films. The same year the streaming service organized a competition under the banner of StarzPlay Short Film Competition (SBFC). Most of the competing titles are available on the streaming service.
StarzPlay by Cinepax has partnerships with PTCL, Telenor and Jazz.

The streaming service is available on Android, IOS, Web and Chromecast.

See also
 Cinepax
 Starz

References

External links
 

2018 mergers and acquisitions
Internet properties established in 2018
Starz Entertainment Group
Subscription video on demand services
Internet television streaming services